Archibold Figlan is a South African politician, currently a Member of the Western Cape Provincial Parliament with the Democratic Alliance.

He was previously a member of national Parliament, and the Shadow Deputy Minister of Human Settlements.

He was found guilty of sexual harassment by an internal disciplinary committee and has received a suspended sentence for his crimes. He was charged after holding a colleagues hand against his private parts.

References 

Living people
Democratic Alliance (South Africa) politicians
Members of the National Assembly of South Africa
Year of birth missing (living people)